Pirates of Black Cove is a pirate-themed real-time strategy game published by Paradox Interactive in August 2011.

Gameplay
The player plays as one of three pirates sailing in an open sea in the Caribbean collecting items and fighting enemy ships. The game mixes adventure and strategy. The player can enter a port and take control as the captain and his mates. More mates can be recruited from pirate strongholds and each has its own special abilities.

Reception

The game received "mixed" reviews according to the review aggregation website Metacritic. IGN and GameSpot praised the game's vibrant visuals and charming presentation, but heavily criticized the gameplay and repetitiveness.

References

External links

 

2011 video games
Nitro Games games
Paradox Interactive games
Real-time strategy video games
Single-player video games
Video games about pirates
Video games developed in Finland
Video games set in the Caribbean
Windows games
Windows-only games